The UK Health Security Agency (UKHSA) is a government agency in the United Kingdom, responsible since April 2021 for England-wide public health protection and infectious disease capability, and replacing Public Health England. It is an executive agency of the Department of Health and Social Care (DHSC).

The formation of the UKHSA essentially transferred Public Health England's health improvement functions to DHSC, while its health protection elements form part of the new government agency. Staff and systems were moved into the new organisation in 2021. PHE continued to have a shadow existence until September 2021. UKHSA became fully operational on 1 October 2021.

Formation 
A new organisation, initially to be called the Centre for Health Protection, was proposed by Matt Hancock, the Secretary of State for Health and Social Care, in July 2020 to combine NHS Test and Trace, the Joint Biosecurity Centre and the health protection functions of Public Health England (PHE). Under the name of the National Institute for Health Protection (NIHP), the organisation was established by Hancock on 18 August 2020 as a single leadership structure bringing together NHS Test and Trace, the Joint Biosecurity Centre and all of PHE. Due to the ongoing COVID-19 pandemic, the new organisation was not formally established until 1 April 2021, by which time it was called the UK Health Security Agency. It reports directly to the Secretary of State for Health and Social Care.

Baroness Harding was the interim executive chair of the new organisation from 18 August 2020 to 7 May 2021. In 2022, the High Court found that her appointment to the position broke equalities legislation. She had been the chair of NHS Improvement since 2017, and at the time was head of the NHS Test and Trace programme, established in May 2020. She was a former chief executive of the TalkTalk Group who sits in the House of Lords as a member of the Conservative Party and is married to Conservative Party Member of Parliament John Penrose. During questioning by the Science and Technology Committee of the House of Commons, Harding said she held the interim leadership while a full application process was carried out.

In August 2020, Health Secretary Matt Hancock said that the NIHP would learn from South Korea and from Germany's Robert Koch Institute "where their health protection agencies have a huge, primary, focus on pandemic response".

The Telegraph first leaked news of the plans for the new agency on 16 August 2020. They claimed that Public Health England was to be "scrapped" and replaced by a single body combining it with NHS Test and Trace, in response to the COVID-19 pandemic. A leaked memo to staff written by the head of Public Health England, Duncan Selbie, said that the aim of the new body was to boost expertise with "much needed new investment". Selbie apologised to staff that the news of the organisation's demise was briefed to The Telegraph before they were told.

In February 2021, Harding said that the new body would not be "fully staffed and up and running" until October 2021.

On 24 March 2021, Hancock announced that the organisation would be formally established on 1 April 2021 under the new name of the UK Health Security Agency, with Dr Jenny Harries stepping down as England's Deputy Chief Medical Officer to become chief executive, and Ian Peters to be chair. Hancock also confirmed that Harries would take over from Harding as lead of England's test, trace and isolate programme.

Role 
The responsibilities of the UKHSA include:
 The health protection functions of Public Health England
 Planning and executing the response to external health threats such as pandemics
 The Joint Biosecurity Centre
 NHS Test and Trace
 Regulation of Coronavirus diagnostic devices 

UKHSA collaborates with Public Health Scotland, Public Health Wales and Northern Ireland's Public Health Agency.

Response 
A 2020 BMJ editorial described the creation of the agency as "extremely foolhardy". It characterised the National Institute for Health Protection as "seem[ing] remarkably similar to the Health Protection Agency abolished in 2013." An August 2020 editorial in The Spectator welcomed the return to an organisation similar in remit to that agency; it criticised Public Health England's focus on health improvement topics such as obesity and binge drinking, arguing that these should be tackled by local NHS health teams. In August 2020 The Telegraph welcomed the change, characterising PHE as the quango "responsible for many critical failures over the course of this [COVID-19] pandemic" that had to be scrapped.

On 2 September 2020, more than 70 health organisations wrote to the government to express concern about the future of health improvement work under these changes.

The appointment of Lady Harding as interim executive chair of the new body was criticised by health experts as she did not have a background in health, and because of her political position. The Guardian quoted allies of hers who, in response, said that she had quickly learned after being appointed chair of NHS Improvement in 2017 and that she had a record of "getting things done" while working in business.

The timing of the reorganisation, during the ongoing pandemic response, was criticised by various health experts and other bodies, including the editorial in the BMJ, the Institute for Government, the King's Fund, and Christina Marriott, the chief executive of the Royal Society for Public Health. An editorial in The Guardian compared it to "reorganising a fire brigade as it tries to put out a blaze" and said the decision had been made without proper consultation or scrutiny.

References

External links
 September 2020 UK Government Policy Paper setting out the responsibilities of the NIHP
 Establishing the National Institute for Health Protection – House of Commons Library, February 2021

Public Health England
2021 establishments in England
National public health agencies
Government agencies established in 2021
Executive agencies of the United Kingdom government
COVID-19 pandemic in the United Kingdom and government structures